Maria de Knuijt, was a prominent figure in the life of the Dutch painter Johannes Vermeer. She was one of Vermeer's most important patrons and provided support and financial assistance to him throughout his career.

Biography 
Maria de Knuijt was born in 16?? in Delft, Netherlands, and married Pieter van Ruijven in 1653. The couple had one child, Magdalena, who survived infancy. Reynier Bolnes was a brewer and a member of the city government, and the couple lived in a large house on the Oude Delft canal in Delft. She is not to be confused with Maria Thin, the mother-in-law of Vermeer who was also instrumental in supporting his artistic endeavours. Vermeer married Maria Thins's daughter, Catharina Bolnes, in 1653, and the couple had several children.

Maria's husband died in 1666, leaving her a wealthy widow. She continued to live in the family home with her children. Maria was known for her intelligence, wit, and charm, and she was a respected member of Delft society.

After the death of her first husband, Reynier Bolnes, Maria married Johannes Thins in 1675. Thins was a silk merchant and the couple lived together in the family home on the Oude Langendijk canal in Delft. Maria is primarily remembered by her maiden name or her married name from her first husband, Reynier Bolnes, due to her more significant association with Johannes Vermeer as his patron.

Despite her reputation as a wealthy and influential member of society, Maria lived a relatively private life. There are few records of her activities or social interactions beyond her role as a patron of the arts, and it is unclear how she spent her time outside of her involvement in cultural and civic institutions.

Maria died in Delft in 1680, at the age of 51. She was buried in the Oude Kerk, the same church where Vermeer is also buried. It is said that Vermeer was deeply saddened by her death.

Patronage 
Maria de Knuijt played a significant role as a patron of the arts, particularly in supporting Johannes Vermeer, who is now recognized as one of the greatest Dutch painters of all time. Maria's support for Vermeer was not just financial. She also provided him with a studio space in her home, where he painted some of his most famous works, such as "Girl with a Pearl Earring" and "The Music Lesson." In addition, Maria helped Vermeer establish connections with other wealthy patrons in Delft and beyond, which helped him to gain more commissions and sell his paintings for higher prices.

Maria's support for Vermeer was critical, as he struggled to make a living from his art during his lifetime. His paintings were not as well known or valued during his time as they are today, and he often had trouble finding patrons willing to commission or purchase his works. Maria's support provided him with a stable base from which to work, and allowed him to create some of his most famous and enduring works.

Maria's role as an art patron was not unusual for women of her time and social status. Women often played a significant role in supporting the arts in 17th century Dutch society, both as patrons and as collectors. Maria's support for Vermeer was particularly notable, however, as she was one of his most important patrons and played a significant role in shaping his career.

Involvement in music and literature 
While Maria de Knuijt is best known for her patronage of Johannes Vermeer, she also supported other artists and cultural institutions in Delft. Her involvement in the arts extended beyond painting, and she was also a patron of music and literature.

One of the musicians who received Maria's support was the composer Jacob van Eyck, who was a carillon player and flautist in Delft. Maria was a frequent visitor to his house, and it is likely that she commissioned music from him. She was also a patron of the poet Pieter Corneliszoon Hooft, who was a prominent figure in Dutch literature during the 17th century.

Maria's support for the arts was not limited to individuals. She was also involved in the cultural life of Delft more broadly, and supported the local civic institutions that provided funding for artistic and cultural projects. For example, she was a member of the civic guard, which was responsible for organizing public festivals and events.

Maria's support for the arts was likely motivated by a deep appreciation for culture and a desire to support the creative endeavors of others. Her involvement in the arts helped to make Delft a vibrant center of cultural activity during the 17th century.

References 

1666 deaths
Dutch women
People from Delft
Patrons of the arts
Year of birth missing